Alfonso Valenzuela-Aguilera is a Mexican architect, critical theorist and urban planner.

Professor of Urban Planning at the State University of Morelos, Mexico, he was trained as an architect at the Universidad Iberoamericana, holding degrees in Urban Planning by the University Institute of Architecture of Venice and a PhD in Urbanism by UNAM, Mexico. Dr. Valenzuela was a postdoctoral Fellow at the French Institute of Urbanism in Paris, a visiting Fulbright scholar at the Massachusetts Institute of Technology and for three years a visiting scholar at the Institute of Urban and Regional Development (IURD), at the University of California at Berkeley. A consultant on urban revitalization strategies to the UN Economic Commission for Latin America, his work has been funded by several international institutions and organizations and has published widely in specialized planning journals. He was named a Fulbright and a Guggenheim Fellow and selected by the World Bank Institute as one of the Top 30 Social Innovators in 2010. He has been a visiting scholar at the University of Tokyo, Oxford Brookes University, the Technical University of Athens, and the Institute of Social Sciences (ICS), University of Lisbon. He was appointed the Alfonso Reyes Chair at the Institute of High Studies for Latin America (IHEAL) at the University of Paris-Sorbonne and a Visiting Professor at the Istituto Universitario di Architettura di Venezia, the University of Texas at Austin, the University of Calgary, Rice University, the University of Buenos Aires, was appointed the John Bousfield Distinguished Visiting Professor in Planning at the University of Toronto and the Edmundo O'Gorman Visiting Professor at Columbia University in 2022.

Selected publications
 Valenzuela Alfonso «The Financialization of Latin American Real Estate Markets. New Frontiers», New York: Routledge, 2022.
 Valenzuela Alfonso «Failed Markets: The crisis on the private production of social housing in Mexico», en Latin American Perspectives, Vivienda, Infraestructura y Desigualdad en Ciudades Latinoamericanas, 2016.
 Valenzuela Alfonso «El bosque en la ciudad: la invención del urbanismo moderno en la Ciudad de México (1870-1930)», in Les Cahiers Amérique Latine Histoire et Mémoire (ALHIM), special issue on “La transformation de l’espace urbain en Amérique Latine (1870- 1930): discours et pratiques de pouvoir” N° 29, 2015.
 Valenzuela Alfonso «Mercados Fallidos», en Ciudades, Revista de la Red Nacional de Investigación Urbana, Año 21, No.106, (Abril-Junio 2015), pp. 17–24.
 Valenzuela Alfonso «Seguridad y territorio», en Ciudades, Revista de la Red Nacional de Investigación Urbana, Año 21, No.105, (Enero-Marzo 2015), pp. 43–49.
 Valenzuela Alfonso «Formal/Informal/Ilegal. Los tres circuitos de la economía espacial en América Latina» (with R. Monroy-Ortiz), in Journal of Latin American Geography, volumen 13 (1) de marzo, 2014.
 Valenzuela Alfonso «Territorios Rebeldes: la puesta en valor del patrimonio cultural en Tepoztlán, México», en PASOS. Revista de Turismo y Patrimonio Cultural, Vol. 11 No. 3, pp. 21–34 (Octubre, 2013).
 Valenzuela Alfonso «Urban Surges: Power, Territory and the Social Control of Space in Latin America», in Latin American Perspectives March Vol. 40 No. 2, pp. 21-34 (March 2013).
 Valenzuela Alfonso «Dispositivos de la globalización: la construcción de grandes proyectos urbanos en Ciudad de México», in EURE, Vol.39, No.116, pp.101-118 (January, 2013).
 Valenzuela Alfonso «La Eficacia Colectiva como Estrategia de Control Social del Espacio Barrial: Evidencias desde Cuernavaca, México», in Revista INVI, Vol. 27, No.74, pp. 187–215 (Mayo, 2012).
 Valenzuela Alfonso «Racionalidad y poder: Las elites de la ciudad de México  (1876-1940)», in Iberoamericana. América Latina – España – Portugal. Año XII, Nueva Época, No. 45, pp. 9-27. (June 2012).
 Valenzuela Alfonso Ciudades Seguras. Seguridad Ciudadana, Eficacia Colectiva y Control Social del Espacio. (Safe Cities. Citizens’ Security, Collective Efficacy and Social Control of Space), Mexico: Miguel Ángel Porrúa Editores (2011). 
 Valenzuela Alfonso «Dispositivi Globali: La Construzione di Grandi Progetti Urbani a Città del Messico», in Archivio di Studi Urbani e Regionali (Global Devices. The Construction of Megaprojects in Mexico City), No. 101-102, (September 2011)
 Valenzuela Alfonso «Sustentabilidad, poder y desigualdad» (Sustainability, power and inequity), in Ciudades, Revista de la Red Nacional de Investigación Urbana, Año 21, No.91, (Abril-Junio 2011).
 Valenzuela Alfonso «Venecia: Palimpsestos y Ciudades Intangibles» (Venice: Palimpsests and Intangible Cities), in Inventio. No 13, pp. 98-104 (Marzo 2011).
 Valenzuela Alfonso «Surveillance, Territory and the Rule of Law in Mexico City», in Prima Facie - Direito, História e Política. Special Issue on Public Security and Violence. Vol. 10, No 18, Año 10, (Jan-Jun 2011).
 Valenzuela Alfonso «Género, Redes Comunitarias y la Construcción de la Seguridad Ciudadana en México» (Gender, Community Networks and the construction of Citizen’s security in Mexico) with Luz Adriana Muñoz Echeverry, in Ciudades. Revista de la Red Nacional de Investigación Urbana, Año 21, No.88, (Oct-Dec 2010).
 Valenzuela Alfonso «Desarrollo sustentable del territorio en las megaciudades» (Sustainable development of the territory in megacities), in Cuadernos Geográficos, núm. 47, 2010, pp. 73-93. (October 2010).
 Valenzuela, Alfonso «Violencia y control social del territorio» (Violence and the social control of territory), in Ciudades. Revista de la Red Nacional de Investigación Urbana, Año 21, No.86, (April-June 2010).
 Valenzuela, Alfonso «Ivan Illich and the leisure pursuit of free people» in Radical History Review, Issue 102: History and Critical Pedagogies: Transforming Consciousness, Classrooms, and Communities, New York. (Fall, 2008).
 Valenzuela, Alfonso «Santa Fé (México): Megaproyectos para una ciudad dividida» (Santa Fe, Mexico: Megaprojects for a divided city) in Cuadernos Geográficos No.40, Special Issue on Urban Forms and Conflict / New Urban Forms, pp. 53-66 (2007).
 Valenzuela, Alfonso «The politics of fear: securing public space in a divided city», in Plan Canada, Special Issue on Security in the City, Vol. 46, No.3, (Autumm, 2006).
 Valenzuela, Alfonso «Mexico City and the places of Globalization», in SUR, Vol. 4 No.3, Center for Sustainable Urban Regeneration, University of Tokyo, Japan, pp.20-23. (November, 2006)
 Valenzuela, Alfonso «City of fear: The social control of urban space in Latin America», in TRIALOG No. 87: Violence and Insecurity in Cities, Zeitschrift für das Planen und Bauen in der Dritten Welt: Gewalt und Sicherheit in der Stadt (June 2005).
 Valenzuela, Alfonso «El origen del miedo: Enclaves Urbanos y Seguridad Pública en la Ciudad de Mexico» (The origin of fear: gated communities and Public Security in Mexico City), in Revista Imaginales, No.2, pp. 157-172. Universidad de Sonora/COLSON, (Jul-Dec 2005).

External links
 http://lap.sagepub.com/site/misc/index/podcast.xhtml
 https://web.archive.org/web/20100415210143/http://innovationfair.ning.com/
 http://iurd.berkeley.edu/
 https://web.archive.org/web/20080325203340/http://socrates.berkeley.edu:7001/Events/series/latinamerican/index.html
 http://www.onassis.gr/enim_deltio/foreign/07/lecture_06.php
 https://web.archive.org/web/20090105083649/http://depts.washington.edu/jlaus/pastissues.html
 https://web.archive.org/web/20110719045000/http://www.irmgard-coninx-stiftung.de/fileadmin/user_upload/pdf/urbanplanet/identities/ws3/015%20Valenzuela.pdf
 http://csur.t.u-tokyo.ac.jp/sur/pdf/04/sur04_006.pdf
 https://web.archive.org/web/20110710125031/http://jsgmf.digitalpulp.com/fellows/16416-alfonso-valenzuela-aguilera
 https://web.archive.org/web/20090721165822/http://www.cuernavacaforum.org/
 https://web.archive.org/web/20100202172825/http://www.urbanorth.org/

Living people
Mexican urban planners
National Autonomous University of Mexico alumni
Academic staff of the University of Paris
Massachusetts Institute of Technology faculty
UC Berkeley College of Environmental Design faculty
Architecture firms of Mexico
Artists from Mexico City
1964 births